The following radio programmes were made for national radio in Manchester, England, mainly for the BBC national networks:

References